The chestnut-throated spinetail (Synallaxis cherriei) is a species of bird in the family Furnariidae. It is mainly found in the eastern Amazon Basin, with small numbers in Colombia, Ecuador, and Peru.

Its natural habitats are subtropical or tropical moist lowland forests and heavily degraded former forest. It is becoming rare due to habitat loss.

References

chestnut-throated spinetail
Birds of the Amazon Basin
Birds of the Ecuadorian Amazon
Birds of the Peruvian Amazon
chestnut-throated spinetail
Taxonomy articles created by Polbot